Almora is a district in the Kumaon Division of Uttarakhand state, India. The headquarters is at Almora. It is 1,638 meters above sea level. The neighbouring regions are Pithoragarh district to the east, Chamoli district to the west, Bageshwar district to the north and Nainital district to the south.

History

The ancient town of Almora was capital of the Kumaon Kingdom, before its establishment, it was under the possession of Katyuri king Baichaldeo.  Later on when the Chand dynasty was founded in Champawat, the town of Almora was founded at this centrally located place in 1568 by Kalyan Chand. Later Chand kings shifted the capital of the Kumaon Kingdom from Champawat to Almora. 

Almora town was the administrative headquarter of the Kumaun district; that was formed in 1815 following the defeat of Gorkha army in the Anglo-Gorkha war and the 1816 Treaty of Sugauli. The Kumaun district then consisted of the complete Kumaon Division excluding the Terai district with its headquarters at Kashipur. In 1837, Garhwal was made a separate district with its headquarters at Pauri. The Nainital district was carved out of the Kumaun District in 1891, and the Kumaon District was then renamed Almora District after its headquarter.

In the 1960s Bageshwar district, Pithoragarh district and Champawat district had not yet been formed and were part of Almora district. Pithoragarh district was carved out of Almora on 24 February 1960 and Bageshwar district on 15 September 1997. In 2011, Ranikhet District was proposed to be carved out of the Almora District and has yet to come in existence.

Geography

The town of Almora is situated over a horse saddle-shaped ridge of a mountain. The eastern portion of the ridge is known as Talifat and the western one is known as Selifat. The market is at the top of the ridge where these two, Talifat and Selifat jointly terminate.

The place of the present cantonment was formerly known as Lalmandi. Presently where the collectorate exists, the 'Malla Mahal' (Upper Court) of Chanda kings was located. The site of present District Hospital used to be 'Talla Mahal' (Lower Court) of Chand rulers.

Simalkhet is a village situated in the border of Almora and Chamoli.  People of this village can speak both Kumauni and Garhwali languages.  On the top of a hill there is a temple called Bhairav Gadi.

Gori River flows through Almora District.

Visitor attractions 
 Chitai Temple,  from the main city of Almora, is dedicated to the Hindu deity Golu Devata, the god of justice, popular in Kumaon region. An incarnation of the Lord Shiva, he is traditionally thought to fulfill wishes if prayed to with a clear conscience. 
 Nanda Devi Temple is a Hindu temple to the Goddess Nanda Devi in the center of the town, with unusual image carving on the temple walls. Nanda Devi festival is held annually in September.
 Bright End Corner,  from the main city of Almora, is a beauty spot visited at sunrise and sunset. A circuit house, Swami Vivekanand Memorial and Vivekanand Library is also situated here.
 Binsar Mahadev Temple was built around the 9-10 century A.D. It is believed locally to have been built in a single day. Ladies come here on Vaikunth chaturdashi and light a lamp on their palm to fulfill the desire of child. It is known for its archeological significance and its dense forest. 
 Lal Bazaar is a shopping centre for local crafts, woolen garments, decorative items and metal utensils.
 Someshwar,  from Almora city is famous for its ancient Lord Shiva Temple, constructed by Raja Som Chand during the Chand Dynasty.
 Jageshwar is known for its Shiva temple within a dense forest. The temple complex has 124 shrines and hundreds of statues.

Administrative subdivisions
District of Almora is divided into nine tehsils: Almora, Bhikiyasain, Bhanoli, Chaukhutiya, Dwarahat, Jainti, Ranikhet, Someshwar, Syalde and Sult.

Its Assembly constituencies are Dwarahat, Salt, Ranikhet, Someshwar (SC), Almora, and Jageshwar.

अल्मोड़ा पहले कुमाऊं कमिश्नर ई का एक भाग था और 1839 में ही अस्तित्व में आया था

Culture and literature
Almora was also the site of the dance academy set up by Udai Shankar, danseuse, in 1938 – several well-known Indian and French dancers trained there. The Almora dance academy was housed in Pine Lodge on the outskirts of the town (Ranidhara). The site has views of the Himalayas and the city.
"In these hills, Nature’s hospitality eclipses all that man can ever do. The enchanting beauty of the Himalayas, their bracing climate and the soothing green that envelops you, leave nothing more to be desired. I wonder whether the scenery of these hills and the climate are to be surpassed, if equalled, by any of the beauty spots of the world. After having been for nearly three weeks in the Almora hills, I am more than ever amazed why our people need to go to Europe in search of health."
- Mahatma M.K. Gandhi

"These mountains are associated with the best memories of our race: Here, therefore, must be one of centers, not merely of activity, but more of calmness of meditation, and of peace and I hope some one to realize it."
- Swami Vivekananda (replying to the address given to him by the people of Almora)

Transport

The Nearest airports to Almora are Pantnagar Airport (127 km) in Nainital and Naini Saini Airport (125 km) in Pithoragarh.

The nearest railway station is at Kathgodam, 90 km, from where direct trains are available for Delhi, Lucknow and Agra.  Some of the major trains from Kathgodam are:
Sampark Kranti Express (5035/506)
Howrah Express (3019/3020)
Ranikhet Express (5013/5014)
Rampur Passenger (1/2 R.K. Passenger and 3/4 R.K. Passenger)
Naintial Express (5308/5307)
 Garib Rath (weekly)

Almora is well connected by road to important centres in the region. NH 87 passes through to almora is known as karnaprayag national highway. Some distances:
 Delhi (378 km)
 Dehradun (394 km)
 Bageshwar (74 km), (92 km via Kausani)
 Nainital (63 km) (via Ranikhet 103 km)
 Kathgodam (86 km)
 Haldwani (91 km)
 Ramnagar (120 km), (via Nainital- 150 km)
 Rudrapur (130 km)
 Ranikhet (45 km)
 Dwarahat (68 km)
 Pithoragarh (120 km)
 Lucknow (454 km)
 Bareilly (191 km)
 chaukhutia (93 km)

Demographics

According to the 2011 census Almora district has a population of 622,506, roughly equal to the nation of Montenegro or the US state of Vermont. This gives it a ranking of 517th in India (out of a total of 640). Its population growth rate over the decade 2001-2011 was −1.73%. Almora has a sex ratio of 1139 females for every 1000 males, and a literacy rate of 81.06%. Scheduled Castes and Scheduled Tribes make up 22.68% and 0.21% of the population respectively.

In 2001, Hindus were 621,203, Muslims 7,283 (1.15%), Christians 959. Most of the population lives near the main market of almora that forms nearly 45% of the population.

The major first language of the district is Kumaoni, spoken by over 90% of the population.

Notable people
 MS Dhoni
 Manohar Shyam Joshi (1933–2006), writer; born in Almora.
 Sumitranandan Pant, writer; born in Almora.
 B. D. Pande Former Cabinet Secretary of India and Governor of West Bengal, Punjab is a resident of Almora
 Prasoon Joshi, writer, lyricist`
 Murli Manohar Joshi (Former Human Resource Development Minister of India)
 Govind Ballabh Pant ( First chief minister of U.P)
 Ekta Bisht: Indian national cricket team member
 Naima Khan Upreti  (1938–2018) was an Indian theatre actor, singer and a producer at Doordarshan.

Villages
 

Bhagoti

References

External links
 

 
Districts of Uttarakhand